Cittiglio is a comune (municipality) in the Province of Varese in the Italian region Lombardy, located about  northwest of Milan and about  northwest of Varese. The town is known as the birthplace of Alfredo Binda, a world-class bicycle racer in the 1920s and 1930s.

Cittiglio borders the following municipalities: Brenta, Caravate, Castelveccana, Gemonio, Laveno-Mombello.

The elite women's professional road bicycle racing event Trofeo Alfredo Binda-Comune di Cittiglio is held annually here.

Demographic evolution

Twin towns — sister cities
Cittiglio is twinned with:

  Camerota, Italy

References

External links
 www.comune.cittiglio.va.it/